Väinämöinen is a demigod, hero and the central character in Finnish folklore and the main character in the national epic Kalevala by Elias Lönnrot. Väinämöinen was described as an old and wise man, and he possessed a potent, magical singing voice.

In Finnish mythology

The first extant mention of Väinämöinen in literature is in a list of Tavastian gods by Mikael Agricola in 1551. He and other writers described Väinämöinen as the god of chants, songs and poetry; in many stories Väinämöinen was the central figure at the birth of the world. The Karelian and Finnish national epic, the Kalevala, tells of his birth in the course of a creation story in its opening sections. This myth has elements of creation from chaos and from a cosmic egg, as well as of earth diver creation.

At first there were only primal waters and Sky. But Sky also had a daughter named Ilmatar. One day, Ilmatar descended to the waters and became pregnant. She gestated for a very long time in the waters not being able to give birth. One day a goldeneye was seeking a resting place and flew to the knee of Ilmatar, where it laid its eggs. As the bird incubated its eggs Ilmatar's knee grew warmer and warmer. Eventually she was burned by the heat and responded by moving her leg, dislodging the eggs that then fell and shattered in the waters. Land was formed from the lower part of one of the eggshells, while sky formed from the top. The egg whites turned into the moon and stars, and the yolk became the sun.

Ilmatar continued to float in the waters. Her footprints became pools for fish, and by pointing she created contours in the land. In this way she made all that is. Then one day she gave birth to Väinämöinen, the first man. Väinämöinen swam until he found land, but the land was barren. With Sampsa Pellervoinen he spread life over the land.

In the eighteenth century folk tale collected by Cristfried Ganander, Väinämöinen is said to be son of Kaleva and thus brother of Ilmarinen. His name is believed to come from the Finnish word väinä, meaning stream pool.

In the Kalevala

In the nineteenth century, some folklorists, most notably Elias Lönnrot, the writer of Kalevala, disputed Väinämöinen's mythological background, claiming that he was an ancient hero, or an influential shaman who lived perhaps in the ninth century. Stripping Väinämöinen from his direct godlike characteristics, Lönnrot turned Väinämöinen into the son of the primal goddess Ilmatar, whom Lönnrot had invented himself. In this story, it was she who was floating in the sea when a duck laid eggs on her knee.
He possessed the wisdom of the ages from birth, for he was in his mother's womb for seven hundred and thirty years, while she was floating in the sea and while the earth was formed. It is after praying to the sun, the moon, and the great bear (the stars, referring to Ursa Major) that he is able to leave his mother's womb and dive into the sea.

Väinämöinen is presented as the 'eternal bard', who exerts order over chaos and established the land of Kaleva, and around whom revolve so many of the events in Kalevala. His search for a wife brings the land of Kaleva into, at first friendly, but later hostile contact with its dark and threatening neighbour in the north, Pohjola. This conflict culminates in the creation and theft of the Sampo, a magical artifact made by Ilmarinen, the subsequent mission to recapture it, and a battle which ends up splintering the Sampo and dispersing its parts around the world to parts unknown.

Väinämöinen also demonstrated his magical voice by sinking the impetuous Joukahainen into a bog by singing. Väinämöinen also slays a great pike and makes a magical kantele from its jawbones.

Väinämöinen's end is a hubristic one. The 50th and final poem of the Kalevala tells the story of the maiden Marjatta, who becomes pregnant after eating a berry, giving birth to a baby boy. This child is brought to Väinämöinen to examine and judge. His verdict is that such a strangely born infant needs to be put to death. In reply, the newborn child, mere two weeks old, chides the old sage for his sins and transgressions, such as allowing the maiden Aino, sister of Joukahainen, to drown herself. Following this, the baby is baptized and named king of Kalevala. Defeated, Väinämöinen goes to the shores of the sea, where he sings for himself a boat of copper, with which he sails away from the mortal realms. In his final words, he promises that there shall be a time when he shall return, when his crafts and might shall once again be needed. Thematically, the 50th poem thus echoes the arrival of Christianity to Finland and the subsequent fading into history of the old pagan beliefs. This is a common theme among epics, for in the tale of King Arthur, Arthur declares a similar promise before departing for Avalon.

In the original 1888 translation of Kalevala into English by John Martin Crawford, Väinämöinen's name was anglicised as Wainamoinen.

In other cultures
In the Estonian national epic Kalevipoeg, a similar hero is called Vanemuine. In neighbouring Scandinavia, Odin shares many attributes with Väinämöinen, such as connections to magic and poetry.

Popular culture
The Kalevala has been translated into English and many other languages, in both verse and prose, in complete and abridged forms. For more details see list of Kalevala translations.

J. R. R. Tolkien
Väinämöinen has been identified as a source for Gandalf, the wizard in J. R. R. Tolkien's novel The Lord of the Rings. Another Tolkienian character with great similarities to Väinämöinen is Tom Bombadil. Like Väinämöinen, he is one of the most powerful beings in his world, and both are ancient and natural beings in their setting. Both Tom Bombadil and Väinämöinen rely on the power of song and lore. Likewise, Treebeard and the Ents in general have been compared to Väinämöinen.

Akseli Gallen-Kallela
In art (such as the accompanying picture by Akseli Gallen-Kallela), Väinämöinen is described as an old man with a long white beard, which is also a popular appearance for wizards in fantasy literature.

Music
In music, Finnish folk metal band Ensiferum wrote three songs based on/about Väinämöinen, called "Old Man", "Little Dreamer" and "Cold Northland". There is also a direct reference to him in their song "One More Magic Potion", where they have written "Who can shape a kantele from a pike's jaw, like the great One once did?". The band's mascot, who appears on all their albums, also bears a similarity to traditional depictions of Väinämöinen.
Another Finnish metal band named Amorphis released their tenth album The Beginning of Times in 2011. It is a concept album based on the myths and stories of Väinämöinen.
Yet another well-known Finnish metal band, Korpiklaani has released a song about the death of Väinämöinen, Tuonelan Tuvilla, as well as an English version named "At The Huts of the Underworld".
A song on the album Archipelago by Scottish electronic jazz collective Hidden Orchestra is also named "Vainamoinen".
Philadelphia based Black metal band Nihilistinen Barbaarisuus released a song about Väinämöinen simply called "Väinämöinen" on their second studio album The Child Must Die in 2015.
Väinämöinen is also the theme of a composition for choir and harp by Zoltán Kodály, "Wainamoinen makes music", premiered by David Watkins.

Science fiction and fantasy
Joan D. Vinge's The Summer Queen contains characters named Vanamoinen, Ilmarinen and Kullervo. They are not the characters from the legend though but may have been inspired by them. That book is the sequel to her Hugo Award-winning novel The Snow Queen.

Väinämöinen is also a major character in The Iron Druid Chronicles novel, Hammered by Kevin Hearne. The series follows the Tempe, Arizona-based 2,100-year-old Irish Druid, Atticus O'Sullivan. This particular book in the series' main plot point is the ingress of several characters - the Slavic thunder god Perun, O'Sullivan, a werewolf, a vampire, Finnish folk legend Väinämöinen, and Taoist fangshi Zhang Guolao - into Asgard to kill Norse thunder god Thor, all for their own varied reasons.

Comic books
There is a Finnish comic strip called "Väinämöisen paluu" (The Return of Väinämöinen) by Petri Hiltunen, where Väinämöinen returns from thousand-year exile to modern Finland to comment on the modern lifestyle with humor.

In the storyline "Love her to Death" of the web-comic Nukees, Gav, having died, arrives to an afterlife populated by gods. Among them is Väinämöinen, who, among other things, complains that one only gets women by playing the electric kantele.

In the Uncle Scrooge comic "The Quest for Kalevala", drawn by Don Rosa, Väinämöinen helps Scrooge and company to reassemble the Sampo (mythical mill that could produce gold from thin air) and then leaves with it back to Kalevala, but not before giving Scrooge its handle as a souvenir.

In the webcomic "Axis Powers Hetalia", the character of Finland was given the human name Tino Väinämöinen.

References

External links 

Arts gods
Characters in the Kalevala
Creation myths
Finnish gods
Heroes in mythology and legend
Magic gods
Music and singing gods